The River Box is a small river,  in length, that flows through Suffolk, England. It is a tributary of the River Stour.

Toponymy
The present name is a back-formation from Boxford.  A previous name Amalburna is found in an Old English text dated after 991, published in the Cartularium Saxonicum (p. 1289).  Eilert Ekwall discusses various possible roots, including the British (i.e. pre-English) root ambro meaning "water".

Course
The river rises to the north of Little Waldingfield, near to where two other small streams also rise, which converge with the Box at Upsher Green.

From this point the river flows south-east, past Edwardstone towards the large village of Boxford, where it is crossed by the A1071. The river then continues in the same direction and passes a number of villages and hamlets, which are suffixed by the name street. These include Stone Street and to the south of Polstead, Mill Street. The river then passes Scotland Street before reaching the village of Thorington Street, and Thorington Hall. It continues flowing southeast to meet the Stour, between Langham and Higham, which is also close to the confluence of the River Brett and Stour.

Hydrology

Since 1960 the flow of the River Box, has been measured in its middle reaches at a flume near Polstead.

Land use is mostly rural, consisting of arable farming.

The River Box has been classed as having moderate ecological quality under the Water Framework Directive. This is the middle band in the five part framework scale, which ranges from high, good, and moderate, through to poor and finally bad.

References

External links

Rivers of Suffolk
Babergh District